La bambola di Satana ( The Doll of Satan) is a 1969 Italian gothic horror film written and directed by Ferruccio Casapinta.

Plot
When her uncle dies, Elizabeth goes back to her family's castle to hear the reading of his will. Her boyfriend, Jack, suspects a plot to steal Elizabeth's inheritance and keeps a close eye on her. She learns the castle is said to be haunted, and her relatives try to get her to sell it cheaply, but she hesitates. Later, she's kidnapped and brought to a dungeon where Elizabeth is tortured by a hooded figure.

Cast
 Erna Schürer as Elizabeth
 Roland Carey as Jack
 Aurora Battista	
 Ettore Ribotta	
 Manlio Salvatori	
 Franco Daddi	
 Lucie Bomez	
 Beverly Fuller	
 Eugenio Galadini	
 Giorgio Gennari	
 Domenico Ravenna

Production
La bambola di Satana is Ferruccio Casapinta's only film credit as a director. Lead actress Emma Costantino described the production as a "troubled shoot", stating that Ferruccio Casapinta's assistant director was the person who "did everything on set" and that Casapinta "was an idiot who couldn't do anything."

La bambola di Satana was filmed at Castle Borghese in Pomezia, Pratica di Mare and in Abruzzo.

Release
La bambola di Satana was released in Italy on 12 June 1969, where it was distributed by Cinediorama. It grossed a total of 118,009,000 Italian lire on its theatrical release. The film was never dubbed into English and did not receive a theatrical release in the United States.

Critical reception
Roberto Curti, author of Italian Gothic Horror Films, 1957–1969 stated that Ferruccio Casapinta "shows no directorial flair at all." and that for a gothic film, it "looks awful." The review noted that editing was poor, with night and day shots alternating within the same scene and that the special effects were terrible noting the thunderstorms and pink clouds that surround the castle. Curti concluded that the film was an "obscure— and deservedly so— addition to the Gothic genre" Louis Paul, author of Italian Horror Film Directors stated that the film is"certainly rooted within the classic gothic atmosphere of early Italian horrors, but the addition of considerable nudity and a black-gloved killer clearly places La bambola at the cusp of the new age. It is an indication of the changing aspects of the Italian horror film to come." AllMovie gave the film a three and a half star out of five rating, finding that the film "benefits from a slicker look and a better sense of humor." and that "It all seems a bit overwrought, but fans of Italian horror don't come to it for subtlety. Indeed, the nearly operatic histrionics on display are immensely enjoyable, for their camp value if nothing else."

Home media
In 2016, Twilight Time in a Limited
Edition of 3,000 units  released the film for the first time on Blu-ray.
88 Films released a Limited Edition Bluray in 2021.

See also

List of horror films of 1969
List of Italian films of 1969

Footnotes

References

External links
 
La Bambola di Satana review on Devildead

1969 horror films
1969 films
Italian horror films
Gothic horror films
Films shot in Lazio
Films set in castles
Giallo films
1960s Italian films